The 2022 World U23 Ninepin Bowling Classic Championships is the twenty first edition of competition and hold in Elva, Estonia, from 17 to 22 May 2022.

Participating nations

Schedule 
Eleven events will be held held.

All times are local (UTC+3).

Medal summary

Medal table

Men

Women

Mixed

References 

 
2022 in bowling
bowling
bowling
bowling
World U23 Ninepin Bowling Classic Championships